Keith James Parkinson (born 28 January 1956) is an English former professional footballer who played as a centre-back. He played in the Football League for Leeds United, Hull City and Doncaster Rovers.

References

1956 births
Living people
English footballers
Footballers from Preston, Lancashire
Association football central defenders
Leeds United F.C. players
Hull City A.F.C. players
Doncaster Rovers F.C. players
English Football League players